Malaysian singer and songwriter Siti Nurhaliza has recorded material for 17 solo studio albums, two duet studio albums, and has been featured multiple times on songs and singles on various international and Malaysian artists' albums. Her debut album, Siti Nurhaliza I was released on 1 April 1996 by Suria Records after winning the 1995 RTM Bintang HMI singing competition at the age of 16. Before signing the contract with Suria Records, she was approached with offers from three different record labels including Sony Music, BMG Music and Warner Music. The release of her first single, "Jerat Percintaan" saw her rise to fame. In 1997, she was recognized as the Best New Female Artist and "Jerat Percintaan" was awarded the Best Song by Anugerah Industri Muzik. In the same year, the launch of her sophomore album Siti Nurhaliza II helped to propel her fame to Indonesia. In a news report by Billboard, Siti Nurhaliza II was reported to have been sold more than 500 000 units in Indonesia alone.

After releasing 10 solo studio albums with Suria Records, in 2006, she released her eleventh solo studio album through her own company, Siti Nurhaliza Productions. Her first album under her own label, Transkripsi received critical acclaim by Malaysian music critics and was recognized as the Best Album by Anugerah Industri Muzik in 2007. She subsequently released three more solo studio albums, Hadiah Daripada Hati (2007), Lentera Timur (2008), Tahajjud Cinta (2009) and one duet studio album, CTKD: Canda, Tangis, Ketawa, Duka (2009) with an Indonesian singer, Krisdayanti. In 2011, in a partnership with What's Up Entertainment, she released her first and only album that is fully recorded in English to date, All Your Love. In the same year, she announced that she will be managed by Universal Music Group (Malaysia). In 2014 and 2016, Fragmen and Unplugged earned her sixth and seventh win respectively for the Best Album award by Anugerah Industri Muzik.

Although she is well known for her pop music, she was born and raised in a traditional music-inclined family. She has released four traditional solo albums, Cindai (1997), Sahmura (2000), Sanggar Mustika (2002), Lentera Timur (2008) and one traditional duet album with Noraniza Idris, Seri Balas (1999). Apart from recording her own material, she also has recorded various songs including theme songs for Malaysian and Indonesian films and television series such as "Bagaikan Sakti", "Ketika Cinta", "Muara Hati", "Jaga Dia Untukku", and "Seluruh Cinta". She also has been involved with the recording of various campaign jingles for both government and non-government organizations including "1 Malaysia", "Cuti-Cuti Malaysia", "Membaca Gaya Wawasan", "Kau Ilhamku", "Cinta Tanpa Sempadan", and many others. Apart from singing in Malaysian, Indonesian, and English, she has also recorded songs in Mandarin Chinese and Arabic.

Following is a list of songs recorded by Siti Nurhaliza in an alphabetical order. Literal or close translations for non-English songs are provided where available.

Songs

See also
Siti Nurhaliza discography

Additional explanatory notes

References

Siti Nurhaliza